Little Stretton is a village in Shropshire, England.

It is located in the Shropshire Hills Area of Outstanding Natural Beauty between the Long Mynd and Ragleth Hill. Lying on the B5477 south of the market town of Church Stretton (and is part of the civil parish of that town); similarly, the small village of All Stretton lies to the north of Church Stretton on the same road.

The River Ashes Hollow runs through the village and it is a popular place to begin walks up the Long Mynd. The village lies between 590 and 616 feet above sea level. Ragleth Hill lies immediately to the east of the village, on the other side of the Welsh Marches Line and A49. Little Stretton once had its own railway halt: Little Stretton Halt railway station.

To the southwest are the hamlets of Minton and Hamperley, which are part of Church Stretton parish and are included within the parish ward of Little Stretton. Little Stretton was previously a civil parish itself, but the whole parish merged with that of Church Stretton and a large part of All Stretton, to form the modern-day parish of Church Stretton, which is sometimes referred to as "Church Stretton and Little Stretton".

Amenities and attractions
The village has a large Conservation Area. There are many Listed buildings and structures in the village.

Church
There is a small church in the village, built in 1903 - "All Saints". It is a Church of England church and is one of three in the ecclesiastical parish of Church Stretton, along with the churches in All Stretton and Church Stretton. The parish is part of the Diocese of Hereford. It is a very unusual church (for England in the present era) for its construction is timber with a thatched roof replacing the original corrugated iron roof.

Pubs
As of 2012, there are approximately 110 dwellings in the village. Little Stretton today has two public houses: the Green Dragon and the Ragleth Inn (historically the "Sun Inn"), both of which serve a wide range of local real ales.

Brockhurst Castle
Half a mile to the north are the earthwork remains of the 12th-century Brockhurst Castle. It is situated on private land with no public access.

Notable people
Novelist and short story writer Beatrice Harraden (1864-1936) spent summer holidays lodging at the Green Dragon, inspiring her short story At the Green Dragon (published 1894).

Oliver Sandys (1892-1964), widow of Caradoc Evans and a novelist in her own right, lived at the Ancient House, across the road from the church, from the 1950s. A later novel, Quaint Place (1952) was set in this area.

The poet Peter Reading (1946–2011) lived in the village.

The horologist Charles Jendon was a well-known figure in the village for many years; his knowledge of long-case clocks was well known to many specialists in the field.

The music critic Ephriam Monk, who championed the early work of Lionel Crill, who himself was a pioneer in the use of the theremin in classical music, lived in the village between 1952 and 1959.

Gallery

See also
Listed buildings in Church Stretton

References

External links

Church Stretton
Villages in Shropshire
Former civil parishes in Shropshirehttps://en.wikipedia.org/w/index.php?title=Little_Stretton,_Shropshire&action=submit